The Leper Queen is a fictional villain appearing in American comic books published by Marvel Comics. She is the masked leader of the Sapien League, an extremist anti-mutant organization that is similar to Friends of Humanity.

Biography

The Mutant Daughter
The Leper Queen is five months pregnant with her daughter when a mutant passes by and her fetus lurches as it becomes "infected". When her daughter is a few months old, she can already create sparks. At the age of two years, she sest fire to their house which results in her death and her mother's face being burned. Her mother decides to call herself the Leper Queen and to kill all mutants.

Decimation
The day after M-Day, the Leper Queen attacks the Xavier Institute with the Sapien League. She is first seen to be attacking Mammomax, Erg, and Peepers, who are racing to Xavier's mansion for sanctuary. The Sapien League ties them to X-shaped crosses and attempts to burn them to death. They are stopped by Wolverine and Colossus, who had seen the smoke from this attack. After this failure, she also leads an attack on the mansion. It is only by the combined efforts of the X-Men and the Sentinel Squad O*N*E that the Sapien League is stopped. During this fight, Iceman is captured. When the Leper Queen tries to execute him, he suddenly regains his powers and causes her arm to freeze, making her flee and encounter both Outlaw and Peepers as she escapes.

After tracking Polaris and Havok (who had left the institute in search of Lorna's powers) to Puerto Rico, members of the Sapien League are attacked by Havok, who stops their attack on an old man. Then, they call upon the Leper Queen, who is visiting the grave of her daughter. She arrives to kill Havok and Polaris but is stopped by Havok, who has just killed Daap, an alien that crash-landed and bore a striking resemblance to former X-Statix member, Doop. The remains of the alien reform and carry Polaris and the Queen to a nearby temple of Apocalypse. Apocalypse finds the Leper Queen's bloodlust and thirst for vengeance too much to handle and denies her the chance to become one of his Horsemen, Pestilence, gives that "honor" to Polaris instead, and chains the Leper Queen in a dungeon.

Purifiers
It is unknown how she eventually escaped, but it is later revealed that the Leper Queen, alongside other prominent anti-mutant leaders, have been forcibly recruited into the ranks of the Purifiers. She is saved before being executed in the electric chair for the murder of two girls in Guatemala and is infected with the Transmode Virus by Bastion, along with having her head and face even more disfigured. 

At an anti-mutant rally held in Iowa by the Friends of Humanity, the Leper Queen adelivers the former Morlock known as Beautiful Dreamer into the crowd, where her injection with a modified version of the Legacy Virus is responsible for killing all the people attending the rally and herself, even though the Leper Queen feels guilt over killing humans for Bastion's cause. 

After a similar incident where the mutant Fever Pitch is infected and used to kill thousands of innocent people, she later captures Surge, Hellion, and Boom Boom, injecting the same virus in Surge and Hellion. She sends both of them to the United Nations for the same fate as Beautiful Dreamer. She keeps Boom Boom alive as a precaution, knowing that an X-team member will otherwise halt her in her path. While in the middle of giving X-Force an ultimatum—to choose between saving the teens or Boom Boom—Cyclops calls the team away by forcing them to travel through time. Wolverine objects and demands that Domino kills the Leper Queen, but this is heard too late and the team is teleported into the future. Boom Boom, left in the hands of the Leper Queen, is told that she had used Boom Boom to lure X-Force to her location. Since Bastion would not allow the Leper Queen to kill herself, she had planned for X-Force to kill her to save Boom Boom. Leper Queen shoots Boom Boom between the eyes at point-blank range, killing her, before stating that X-Force "failed us both." Nevertheless, in a paradox, X-23 comes back to a point three seconds after the jump, shooting the Leper Queen and saving Boom Boom. The Leper Queen thanks X-23 for killing her, thus freeing her from Bastion.

Powers and abilities
The Leper Queen has an affinity with weapons. She is a highly skilled fighter and is also infected with the Transmode Virus by Bastion.

Personality
During the Sapien League's attack on the mansion, it is said that Leper Queen hates mutants and has been on many mutant hunts. Her sole purpose in life is to kill all mutants as revenge for her daughter's death. She also hides her burnt face with a mask that lifts just when she's about to suppress her opponents.

References

External links
 UncannyXmen.net Character Profile on the Leper Queen

Comics characters introduced in 2006
Fictional female assassins
Marvel Comics martial artists
Marvel Comics female supervillains
Characters created by Peter Milligan
Characters created by Salvador Larroca